Gavin Luka (born 28 January 1997 in Australia) is an Australian rugby union player who plays for the Queensland Reds in Super Rugby. His playing position is prop. He has signed for the Reds squad in 2019.

Reference list

External links
Rugby.com.au profile
itsrugby.co.uk profile

1997 births
Australian rugby union players
Living people
Rugby union props
Queensland Reds players